The 2015 Big Ten Women's Lacrosse Tournament was held April 30 to May 3 at High Point Solutions Stadium in  Piscataway, New Jersey. The winner of the tournament received the Big Ten Conference's automatic bid to the 2015 NCAA Division I Women's Lacrosse Championship. All six conference teams competed in the inaugural event. The tournament format is single elimination. The seeds were based upon the teams' regular season conference record.

Standings

Schedule

Bracket
High Point Solutions Stadium – Piscataway, New Jersey

External links
 Big Ten Women's Lacrosse
 @B1GLacrosse

Big Ten Tournament
Big Ten Women's Lacrosse
Big Ten women's lacrosse tournament
Lacrosse in New Jersey